Frederick Sandham Waller (1822 — 22 March 1905) was a British architect and antiquarian of Gloucester, where he was the resident architect to the Dean and Chapter of Gloucester Cathedral.

Career and family
Waller was articled to the civil engineer and county surveyor for Gloucestershire, Thomas Fulljames (1808–74), who proposed him as a Fellow of the Royal Institute of British Architects in 1856. Waller worked in partnership with Fulljames from 1846–70 and with Walter Bryan Wood from 1852. One of Waller's sons, Frederick William Waller (1848–1933), was articled to his father and was in partnership with him from 1873.

Another of Waller's sons, Samuel Edward Waller, became an artist. Waller's grandson Noel Huxley Waller (1881–1961) also became an architect.

Waller and his wife Annie lived for several years at the Moors, Barnwood Road.
He retired in 1900 and died at Westgrove Barnwood, Gloucestershire, on 22 March 1905.
He was buried at St Bartholomew and St Andrew, Churchdown, on 25 March

Architecture
Most of Waller's architectural commissions were in Gloucestershire. He also designed a Tudor Revival extension that was added to the house at Great Tew Park in Oxfordshire.

Antiquarianism

Waller applied his architectural training to antiquarianism. In 1848 he drew a plan and sections of an historic barn at Shilton, Oxfordshire, that had stone walls and an aisled timber frame. Later the barn was reputedly gutted by fire and at the foot of his drawings Waller added "All now destroyed". However, in 1971 the probable remains of the barn at Shilton with were identified with the help of Waller's drawings.

References

Sources and further reading

19th-century antiquarians
English antiquarians
1822 births
1905 deaths
19th-century English historians
19th-century English architects
Architects from Gloucestershire